Eagle Mountain or Eagle Mountains may refer to:

Summits

Canada
Eagle Mountain, British Columbia near Coquitlam
Eagle Mountain (Alberta) in Banff Park

Republic of Ireland
Mount Eagle (Ireland), a 516 m peak in County Kerry, Ireland.

United Kingdom
Eagle Mountain, Down, a 638 m peak in the Mourne Mountains, County Down, Northern Ireland

United States
Eagle Mountain, summit in Polk County, Arkansas
Eagle Mountain (Lanfair Buttes), San Bernardino County, California
Eagle Mountain (Minnesota)
Eagle Mountain (Ulster County, New York)
Eagle Mountains, a mountain range in California, USA

Communities in the United States
Eagle Mountain, California, a modern-day ghost town and birthplace of the Kaiser Permanente health maintenance organization
Eagle Mountain, Texas, a census-designated place
Eagle Mountain, Utah

Other
Eagle Mountain Lake, a lake in the United States
Eagle Mountain-Saginaw Independent School District, near the lake
Eagle Mountain Railroad, a former private railroad in California, USA
Eagle Mountain (horse), an international champion racehorse